The Society – Political Party of the Successors of Kapodistrias is a Greek political party headed by Michalis Iliadis. It was founded in 2008 by Emmanouil Voloudakis and first participated in the European Parliament election in 2009 with a score of 0.16%. In the 2010 Greek local elections the party supported the Society of Athens for the municipality of Athens.

The party's name refers to Ioannis Kapodistrias.

Electoral results

External links
 

Conservative parties in Greece
Eastern Orthodox political parties
2008 establishments in Greece
Political parties established in 2008